Die Büchse der Pandora may refer to:

 Pandora's Box (play), a 1904 play by Frank Wedekind
 Pandora's Box (1929 film), an adaptation of the play, by G. W. Pabst

See also 
 Pandora's box (disambiguation)